Leaves of the Tree is a 2015 Italian-American mystery drama film directed by Ante Novakovic and starring Eric Roberts, Sean Young, Federico Castelluccio and Armand Assante.  It is based on the book Kindness for the Damned by D.J. Healey.  It is also Novakovic's feature directorial debut.

Cast
 Eric Roberts as Patrick 
 Sean Young
 Federico Castelluccio as Dr. Ferramanti
 Kresh Novakovic
 Marisa Brown
 Armand Assante as Joe Buffa
 Sarah Sebastiana

References

External links
 
 
 

2010s mystery drama films
American mystery drama films
English-language Italian films
Italian mystery drama films
2015 drama films
2015 films
Films scored by Randy Edelman
Films based on American novels
2010s English-language films
2010s American films